Alexander Martin Fransson (born 2 April 1994) is a Swedish professional footballer who plays as a midfielder for Greek Super League club AEK Athens.

Club career

IFK Norrköping
Born in Norrköping, Fransson joined Norrköping as a 14-year-old from Lindö FF in 2008, and played in the club's academy until 2012. He made his Allsvenskan debut on the opening game of the 2013 season, in their away win against Mjällby AIF, the day before his 19th birthday. He made in total 20 appearances in 2013, 18 in the league and two cup games.

His first Allsvenskan goal came also away at Mjällby, scoring the team's only goal in their 3–1 defeat on 14 August 2014. For Norrköping he played as a midfielder.

In the last round of 2015 Allsvenskan, on 31 October 2015, Fransson won his first senior title as Norrköping won the Swedish championship for the first time in 26 years. Eight days later, Fransson and IFK Norrköping took their second title for the season when they defeated 2014–15 Svenska Cupen winners IFK Göteborg in 2015 Svenska Supercupen.

Basel
On 2 January 2016, Basel announced that they had signed Fransson on a four and a half year contract up until 30 June 2020. He joined  Basel's first team for their 2015–16 season under head coach Urs Fischer. After playing in three test games, Fransson  played his domestic league debut for the club in the away game in the Letzigrund on 14 February 2016 as Basel won 4–0 against Grasshopper, coming in as substitute in the 90 minute. He scored his first league goal for the club on 21 February in the home game in the St. Jakob-Park as Basel won 5–1 against Vaduz.

Under trainer Urs Fischer Fransson won the Swiss Super League championship at the end of the 2015–16 Super League season. Fransson played in 16 of the 18 league matches. At the end of the 2016–17 Super League season the team won the championship again. For the club this was the eighth title in a row and their 20th championship title in total. Fransson played in 25 league games. They also won the Swiss Cup for the twelfth time, which meant they had won the double for the sixth time in the club's history. Frannsson played in four of the sic cup games.

On 26 December 2017 Basel announced that Fransson would be loaned to Lausanne-Sport to gain more first-team opportunities.

After the loan period, Fransson returned to the team, but a few days later it was announced that he would leave the club. In his three seasons with the club, Fransson played a total of 81 games for Basel scoring three goals. 51 of these games were in the Swiss Super League, seven in the Swiss Cup, seven in the UEFA competitions (Champions League and Europa League) and 16 were friendly games. He scored two goala in the domestic league and the other was scored during the cup.

Return to IFK Norrköping 
On 4 July 2018, Norrköping announced that they had signed Fransson on a three-year contract until 30 June 2021.

AEK Athens
On 2 February 2022, AEK Athens announced that they had signed Fransson on a one-and-a-half-year contract.

International career
Fransson represented the Sweden U19 national team nine times between 2012 and 2013. In November 2014, Fransson played his first game for Sweden U21.

Fransson made his debut for the Swedish national team in an unofficial friendly against Estonia on 6 January 2016, played in the Armed Forces Stadium in Abu Dhabi. He started the match and played 55 minutes before being substituted in the 1–1 draw. His second cap followed on 10 January in a 3–0 win against Finland played at the same venue. This match was also an unofficial friendly and he came on as a substitute in the 62nd minute.

Career statistics

International
As of 11 January 2019.

Honours
IFK Norrköping
 Allsvenskan: 2015
 Svenska Supercupen: 2015
Basel
 Swiss Super League: 2015–16, 2016–17
 Swiss Cup winner: 2016–17

References

External links

  (archive)
 
 IFK Norrköping profile
 Swiss Football League profile
 
 
 
 

1994 births
Living people
Swedish footballers
Association football midfielders
IFK Norrköping players
FC Basel players
FC Lausanne-Sport players
AEK Athens F.C. players
Allsvenskan players
Swiss Super League players
Super League Greece players
Sweden international footballers
Sweden youth international footballers
Sweden under-21 international footballers
Swedish expatriate footballers
Expatriate footballers in Switzerland
Expatriate footballers in Greece
Swedish expatriate sportspeople in Switzerland
Swedish expatriate sportspeople in Greece
Footballers at the 2016 Summer Olympics
Olympic footballers of Sweden
Sportspeople from Norrköping
Footballers from Östergötland County